Bonanza Hills is a census-designated place in Webb County, Texas, United States. The population was 37 at the 2010 census. This was a new CDP formed from parts of the Botines CDP and additional area prior to the 2010 census.

Geography
Bonanza Hills is located at  (27.794768, -99.469502) along U.S. Highway 83 in north-central Webb County.

Education
Residents are in the United Independent School District. Zoned schools include: San Isidro Elementary School, Elias Herrera Middle School, United High School.

The designated community college for Webb County is Laredo Community College.

References

Census-designated places in Webb County, Texas
Census-designated places in Texas